Moana is a 2016 American 3D computer-animated musical fantasy comedy adventure film produced by Walt Disney Animation Studios and released by Walt Disney Pictures. The film was directed by Ron Clements and John Musker, with Don Hall and Chris Williams as co-directors. Starring the voices of Auliʻi Cravalho and Dwayne Johnson, the film focuses on the story of Moana, the strong-willed daughter of the chief in a Polynesian tribe, who is chosen by the ocean itself to reunite a mystical relic with a goddess. When a blight strikes her island, Moana sets sail in search of Maui, a legendary demigod, in the hope of saving her people. 

The film had its world premiere at El Capitan Theatre in Los Angeles on November 14, 2016 and was released to theaters on November 23, 2016. The review aggregator Rotten Tomatoes reported 96% positive film-critic reviews, based on 218 reviews, with an average rating of 7.9/10 and Metacritic gave a score of 81 out of 100, based on 44 reviews.

Moana have received many nominations and awards, the majority for Best Animated Feature category and for Auliʻi Cravalho performance. At the 44th Annie Awards, Moana received six nominations and won two including Outstanding Achievement, Animated Effects in an Animated Production and Outstanding Achievement for Voice Acting in an Animated Feature Production. Also Lin-Manuel Miranda won a Grammy Award for Best Song Written for Visual Media for "How Far I'll Go", performed by Auliʻi Cravalho.

Accolades

Notes

See also
 2016 in film

References

External links
 

Moana
Moana (2016 film)